Wijiji is an Ancestral Puebloan great house and archaeological site located in Chaco Canyon, in New Mexico, United States.

Comprising just over 100 rooms, it is the smallest of the Chacoan great houses. Built between AD 1110 and 1115, it was the last Chacoan great house to be constructed. Somewhat isolated within the narrow Chaco Wash, it is positioned  from Una Vida.

Etymology 
The name may be the word with the most dotted letters in a row.

References

Bibliography
 

Colorado Plateau
Chaco Canyon
Pueblo great houses
Ancestral Puebloans
Pueblos in New Mexico